Vučko is a surname. Notable people with the surname include:

Hana Vučko (born 1998), Slovenian handball player
Jurica Vučko (born 1976), Croatian footballer
Luka Vučko (born 1984), Croatian footballer

South Slavic-language surnames